David Lance Roberts (born May 28, 1970) is an American former professional ice hockey forward. He is the son of former NHL player Doug Roberts.

Early life
Roberts was born in Alameda, California, and raised in Old Lyme, Connecticut. As a youth, he played in the 1981, 1982 and 1983 Quebec International Pee-Wee Hockey Tournaments with a minor ice hockey team from Middlesex County, Connecticut.

Roberts played prep school hockey at Avon Old Farms and college hocket at the University of Michigan.

Career 
Roberts started his NHL career with the St. Louis Blues in 1993 after playing for the US national hockey team in the 1994 Winter Olympics. He also played with the Edmonton Oilers and Vancouver Canucks.

He also played for the Syracuse Crunch (AHL), Worcester IceCats (AHL), Peoria Rivermen (IHL), Michigan K-Wings (IHL), Grand Rapids Griffins (IHL), Eisbären Berlin in Germany's Deutsche Eishockey Liga, and EV Zug in Switzerland's Nationalliga A.

Roberts currently runs the Dave Roberts Hockey Academy in Ann Arbor, Michigan at Yost Ice Arena. He is a regular member of the Detroit Red Wings Alumni, a charity group that plays throughout the Great Lakes region. He is a financial advisor for Telemus Capital Partners in Ann Arbor, Michigan.

Career statistics

Regular season and playoffs

International

Awards and honors
List of awards and honors.

References

External links

1970 births
American men's ice hockey left wingers
Edmonton Oilers players
Eisbären Berlin players
EV Zug players
Grand Rapids Griffins (IHL) players
Ice hockey players from California
Ice hockey players from Connecticut
Ice hockey players at the 1994 Winter Olympics
Kalamazoo Wings (1974–2000) players
Living people
Michigan Wolverines men's ice hockey players
Olympic ice hockey players of the United States
Sportspeople from Alameda, California
People from Old Lyme, Connecticut
Peoria Rivermen (IHL) players
St. Louis Blues draft picks
St. Louis Blues players
Syracuse Crunch players
Vancouver Canucks players
Worcester IceCats players
Avon Old Farms alumni
AHCA Division I men's ice hockey All-Americans